Roderick John Wells (born 17 November 1936) is an English Anglican priest, who was Archdeacon of Stow in the Diocese of Lincoln from 1989 to 2001.

Wells was an Insurance clerk from 1953 to 1955; a Radar Mechanic in the RAF from 1955 to 1957; and an Assistant Master at Chester Choir School from 1957 to 1959. He then completed a BA at Durham University and a MA at the University of Hull. After a curacy at St Mary-at-Lambeth from, 1965 to 1971; Rector of Skegness from 1971 to 1978; Team Rector of Grimsby from 1978 to 1989; Area Dean of Cleethorpes from 1983 to 1989; Archdeacon of Stow from, 1989 to 2001, and of Lindsey from 1994 to 2001.

See also

References

1936 births
Living people
Archdeacons of Stow
Archdeacons of Lindsey
Alumni of Durham University
Alumni of the University of Hull
20th-century Royal Air Force personnel
Royal Air Force airmen